Clara Colosimo (23 May 1922 – 15 June 1994) was an Italian film actress. She appeared in 65 films between 1968 and 1991.

Selected filmography
 Alfredo, Alfredo (1972)
 Sex Pot (1975)
 Il mostro (1977)
 Zanna Bianca e il grande Kid (1977)
 Orchestra Rehearsal (1978)
 Dear Father (1979)
 Café Express (1980)
 The Lady of the Camellias (1981)
 Eccezzziunale... veramente (1982)
 Il ragazzo di campagna (1984)
 It Was a Dark and Stormy Night (1985)

External links

1922 births
1994 deaths
People from Treviso
Italian film actresses
20th-century Italian actresses